Tabulae patronatus were tables, specially made of bronze and intended to be displayed in public, where a patronage was established under Roman law. In this way, an indigenous population was subject to the tutoring of a political office resident in Rome, in an ambivalent treaty of loyalty and protection. After the death of an employer, it was possible to renew the agreement with another agent through another tabula. Not many have been found, most being unearthed in North-Africa or Hispania. Five are known in this last area: two found in Bocchorus/Bocchoris (10 BC/AD 6), another in Sasamón (AD 239), one with pediment in Cañete de las Torres (AD 247) and another one in Córdoba (AD 349). An inscription found in Rome in AD 222 refers to the patronage of Colonia Clunia Sulpicia.

References

Roman law